Mohammed Nayeemuddin (died  August 8, 2016), commonly known as Nayeem, was a naxal leader and alleged criminal. He first gained prominence in 1993 due to his alleged involvement killing of Indian Police Service officer K. S. Vyas. He and his brother played an important role in killing Belli Lalitha in 1999. He was a resident of Bhongir located in Nalgonda district on the border of Hyderabad.

Nayeem was a leader of Maoist squad which was previously known as "naxalites of People's War" before turning himself in to authorities. Civil rights activists claim that after his surrender, Nayeem served as an informer to the police and helped in the elimination of other naxalites. Police deny this claim.

Nayeem died in a gun battle with police in 2016.

Rao further added Nayeem's gang was involved in 27 murder cases and its involvement was suspected in another 25 murder cases.

References

Indian gangsters
Indian gangsters killed in encounters
Maoists
2016 deaths
Maoism in India